Edward Wilber Berry (February 10, 1875 – September 20, 1945) was an American paleontologist and botanist; the principal focus of his research was paleobotany.

Early life
Berry was born February 10, 1875, in Newark, New Jersey, and finished high school in 1890 at the age of 15.

Career
Berry studied North and South American flora and published taxonomic studies with theoretical reconstructions of paleoecology and phytogeography.   He started his scientific career as an amateur scientist, working with William Bullock Clark as a lab assistant in 1905.  At Johns Hopkins University he held various positions including teacher, research scientist, scientific editor, provost, and dean.  Berry was appointed geologist with the U. S. Geological Survey in 1910 along with the post of assistant state geologist for Maryland in 1917, both positions he kept until retiring in 1942.

Major expeditions
 1919: co-leader, Johns Hopkins George H. Williams Memorial Expedition, Andes Mountains
 1927: geological expedition to Peru and Ecuador
 1933: geological expedition to Venezuela

Participation in scientific societies
 1924: president, Paleontological Society of America
 1945: president, Geological Society of America

Selected bibliography

 1916. The Lower Eocene Floras of Southeastern North America
 1924. The Middle and Upper Eocene floras of Southeastern North America. U.S. Geological Survey Professional Paper 92
 1925. 
 1929. 
 1929. 
 1934. 
 1937.

Awards and honors
 1901: Walker Prize, Boston Society of Natural History
 1921: Fellow of the American Academy of Arts and Sciences
 1922: National Academy of Sciences
 1930:  honorary doctorate by Lehigh University
 1942: Mary Clark Thompson Medal from the National Academy of Sciences

References

Science/AAAS

External links
 Chrono-Biographical Sketches
National Academy of Sciences Biographical Memoir

1875 births
1945 deaths
American botanists
Botanists active in North America
Botanists active in South America
American phycologists
Bryologists
Paleobotanists
Fellows of the American Academy of Arts and Sciences
Members of the United States National Academy of Sciences
Presidents of the Geological Society of America